In the Army Now is a 1994 American war comedy film directed by Daniel Petrie, Jr., written by Ken Kaufman, Stu Krieger, Daniel Petrie, Jr., Fax Bahr, and Adam Small, and starring Pauly Shore, Andy Dick, David Alan Grier, Esai Morales, and Lori Petty. The film earned US$28,881,266 at the box office, making it the fourth-highest-grossing film starring Pauly Shore (behind Encino Man, Son in Law and A Goofy Movie).

Plot
Slackers Bones Conway (Pauly Shore) and Jack Kaufman (Andy Dick) work at "Crazy Boys" discount electronics store in Glendale, California. While goofing off on the job, both aspire to open their own electronics store in the future. Both are fired though after destroying a rack of television sets.

Looking to score some quick start-up money for their store and believing that the commitment will be minimal (they are easily lured by the recruiting slogan "One weekend a month, two weeks a year"), the two join the United States Army Reserves. Bones chooses water purification for their field since his brother was an experienced pool man and the field appeared to be devoid of combat. After surviving basic training, they attend water purification training, meeting up with Christine Jones (Lori Petty), a female recruit longing for infantry, and skittish dental student Fred Ostroff (David Alan Grier). Adopting the nickname of "waterboys", the group then returns to Glendale.

Unbeknownst to Bones and Jack, Libya has been planning an invasion of Chad, and they are consequently called up for service overseas. They first try to get a military discharge by pretending to be homosexuals, but they fail.

Upon arriving in Chad, the four do not get along well with the full-time soldiers, particularly Special Forces Staff Sergeant Stern (Esai Morales). On a routine mission to resupply a forward base, their convoy is ambushed by a Libyan commando squad. The misfit reserves are thought to have been killed in action (KIA) and are left to fend for themselves. After a few days lost in the desert, they are captured by the Libyan forces and spend a night in a Libyan POW camp. There the reservists meet up with Staff Sergeant Stern who has been shot and captured in an ambush. He briefs them on his failed mission to rendezvous with two HALOed Fast Attack vehicles and destroy mobile Scud launchers carrying missiles armed with chemical warheads aimed at American bases in the region.

During an airstrike, the four reservists and Stern escape and find the Fast Attack vehicles. They make contact with the American headquarters and are ordered to finish the Special Forces' mission. After locating the missiles, they have a difficult time holding off a battalion of Libyans while painting the missiles with a laser for an incoming airstrike. The airstrike goes off-target, forcing the reservists to destroy the missiles themselves. Bones grabs an AT4 anti-tank rocket launcher and destroys the Scud launcher base in one hit, but not before accidentally firing one rocket backwards, forcing the group to use the last rocket they have.

The "waterboys" return home as heroes. At the end of the film, they open up their electronics shop next to an Army recruiting station — where two men like themselves are looking skeptical about joining the reserves.

Cast
 Pauly Shore as Private First Class Bones Conway
 Lori Petty as Private Christine Jones
 David Alan Grier as Private Fred Ostroff
 Andy Dick as Private Jack Kaufman
 Esai Morales as Staff Sergeant Stern
 Lynn Whitfield as Drill Sergeant Ladd
 Fabiana Udenio as Gabriella
 Art LaFleur as First Sergeant Brandon T. Williams
 Glenn Morshower as Recruiting Sergeant Richard Day
 Beau Billingslea as Sergeant Daniels
 Peter Spellos as Mr. Quinn

Brendan Fraser reprises his role of Linkovich "Link" Chomovsky from Encino Man in a cameo appearance as a fellow soldier.

Production
In the Army Now was the last film that Pauly Shore did as part of a three-film contract with Disney, the previous two being Encino Man and Son in Law.

Filming locations
 The two main characters play miniature golf at the Malibu Castle located in Hawthorne, California. It was torn down in 2005. 
 The basic training scene was filmed at Fort Sill, located near Lawton, Oklahoma.
 The water treatment training was filmed at Fort Lee, Virginia. Shore actually went through the water treatment training to better understand the job. 
 The desert scenes were filmed in Yuma, Arizona.
 The camp in Chad was filmed at Vasquez Rocks in Agua Dulce, California.

Reception
In the Army Now received almost universally negative reviews. It holds a 6% approval rating on Rotten Tomatoes based on 32 reviews, with an average score of 2.34/10. The consensus states "This 1994 Pauly Shore vehicle stretches its star's thin shtick to the breaking point with a laugh-deficient screenplay that borrows shamelessly from Bill Murray's far superior Stripes".

Year-end lists
 8th worst – Sean P. Means, The Salt Lake Tribune
 Dishonorable mention – Dan Craft, The Pantagraph

References

External links
 
 
 
 

1994 films
1990s war comedy films
American war comedy films
1990s English-language films
Military humor in film
Hollywood Pictures films
Films about the United States Army
Films scored by Robert Folk
Films with screenplays by Daniel Petrie Jr.
Films directed by Daniel Petrie Jr.
1994 comedy films
1990s American films